Madaglymbus is a genus of predaceous diving beetles in the family Dytiscidae. There are about 10 described species in Madaglymbus. They are found in Africa.

Species
These 10 species belong to the genus Madaglymbus:
 Madaglymbus alutaceus (Régimbart, 1900)
 Madaglymbus elongatus (H.J. Kolbe, 1883)
 Madaglymbus fairmairei (Zimmermann, 1919)
 Madaglymbus formosulus (Guignot, 1956)
 Madaglymbus johannis (Wewalka, 1982)
 Madaglymbus mathaei (Wewalka, 1982)
 Madaglymbus milloti (Guignot, 1959)
 Madaglymbus ruthwildae Shaverdo & Balke, 2008
 Madaglymbus strigulifer (Régimbart, 1903)
 Madaglymbus xanthogrammus (Régimbart, 1900)

References

Further reading

 
 
 

Dytiscidae